Barsinella desetta is a moth of the subfamily Arctiinae first described by Harrison Gray Dyar Jr. in 1914. It is found in Panama.

References

Lithosiini